Haitian presidential election, 2015–16 may refer to:

 2015 Haitian presidential election
 February 2016 Haitian presidential election
 November 2016 Haitian presidential election